The 1991 FIA Sportscar World Championship season was the 39th season of FIA World Sportscar Championship motor racing.  It featured the 1991 FIA Sportscar World Championship, which was contested over an eight race series from 14 April to 28 October 28, 1991. The series was open to Group C Sportscars, with Category 1 cars complying with new 1991 Group C rules and Category 2 cars running under the pre 1991 regulations. Teo Fabi won the Drivers Championship and Silk Cut Jaguar won the Teams title.

Schedule

Entries

Note: As Toyota Team Tom's was not a full-season SWC entrant, the team and drivers were not eligible for championship points.

Results and standings

Race results

In order to be classified for points, a team had to complete 90% of the winner's distance.  Further, drivers were required to complete at least 30% of their car's total race distance to qualify for championship points.  Drivers forfeited points if they drove in more than one car during the race.

Drivers' World Championship

Teams' World Championship
Teams only scored points for their highest finishing entry.

References

External links
 1991 Sportscar World Championship race results

 
World Sportscar Championship seasons
Sports